Bangala may refer to:

 Bangala language, a dialect of Lingala that is spoken in Orientale Province in the Democratic Republic of the Congo
 Lingala language itself
 Bangala Dam, a dam in Zimbabwe
 Bangala River, a river of Tanzania
 Bangala Station, the former name of Makanza, a town in the Democratic Republic of the Congo

See also
 Bangalla, a fictional country located in Africa in the comic strip The Phantom
 Bangla (disambiguation)
 Shahi Bangalah, a Muslim state established in Bengal during the 14th century